Vṛddhi (also rendered vr̥ddhi) is a technical term in morphophonology given to the strongest grade in the vowel gradation system of Sanskrit.

Origins

Vṛddhi itself has its origins in proto-vṛddhi, a process in the early stage of the Proto-Indo-European language originally for forming possessive derivatives of ablauting noun stems, with the meaning "of, belonging to, descended from". To form a vṛddhi-derivative, one takes the zero-grade of the ablauting stem (i.e. removes the vowel), inserts the vowel *e in a position which does not necessarily match that of the original vowel, and appends an accented thematic vowel (or accents any existing final thematic vowel). For example:

However, in a later stage of the language this appears to have extended to non-ablauting noun stems that already contained *e, which would contract with the inserted vowel to form a lengthened *ē:

The above example also displays the stressing of the thematic vowel when it already exists. It is this later version of proto-vṛddhi which is displayed in Sanskrit's lengthened vṛddhi grade.

Vṛddhi in Sanskrit

The general phenomenon of vowel gradation, including vṛddhi formation has been extensively studied and documented as part of Sanskrit's vigorous grammatical tradition, most importantly in the Aṣṭādhyāyī of the grammarian Pāṇini.

For example:
   "carried" (zero grade)
   "burden" (first grade, full grade, or guṇa)
   "to be carried" (second grade, lengthened grade, or vṛddhi)

The full pattern of vowel gradation can be observed as follows:

Vṛddhi in Indo-European

In modern Indo-European linguistics it is used in Pāṇini's sense, but not restricted to Sanskrit but applicable to the Indo-European languages in general as well as to the Proto-Indo-European (PIE) language from which this feature was inherited:
  (zero grade of the reconstructed verb meaning "to carry")
  (full grade)
  (vṛddhi, lengthened grade)

Notes

References

Bibliography
 
 
 
 
 
 
 Bucknell, Roderick S, Sanskrit Manual (2000) 

Sanskrit grammar
Vyakarana
Indo-European linguistics